Jayshree Gadkar (21 February 1942 – 29 August 2008) was a noted Marathi and Hindi movie actress and a star of Marathi cinema from the 1950s up to the 1980s.

Personal life
Jayshree was born into a Konkani-speaking family at Kanasgiri (Sadashivgad) near Karwar in the Uttara Kannada district of Karnataka, India. She married Bal Dhuri, a theatre actor best known for his portrayal of Dashratha in Ramanand Sagar's TV serial, Ramayana (where Jayashree herself played his wife, Kaushalya). She also published an autobiography, Ashi Mi Jayshri.

Career
She began her career as a child dance artist. She entered films as a tamasha dancer in movies. Her first role was that of a group dancer in V. Shantaram's Jhanak Jhanak Payal Baaje in 1955, which featured Sandhya as the leading lady. Later, well known Marathi film Director Dinkar D Patil cast her in a small role with dance in his Marathi film Disat Tasa Nasat, opposite Raja Gosavi. This was followed by Sangtye Aika, a tamasha-based movie which was the first in which she played a leading role. This helped her gain fame and recognition and she started doing heroine roles. She eventually became one of the most successful and prolific heriones in the history of the Marathi film industry.

Jayshree acted in about 250 films over a period of four decades. Her filmography was varied and included a rich repertoire of tamasha stories as also mythologicals in addition to socials and love stories. Her films include:

  Sangoo Kashi Me
  Chandoba Chandoba Bhaaglas Ka
  Gharkul 
  Avghachi Sansar 
  Gath Padli Thaka Thaka 
  Aaliya Bhogasi 
  Soon Ladaki Ya Gharchi
  Jiwhala
  Thamb Laxmi Kunku Lawate
  1954 Subah Ka Tara
  1955 Savitri
  1959 Sangte Aika
  1959 Madari
  1960 Police Detective
  1960 Pancharati
  1960 Bindya
  1960 Avaghachi Sansar
  1961 Sasural
  1961 Saranga
  1961 Manini
  1962 Baap Majha Brahmachari
  1962 Sukh Aale Mazhya Daari
  1962 Private Secretary
  1963 Subhadra Haran
  1963 Padada
  1963 Mohityanchi Manjula
  1963 Mere Arman Mere Sapne
  1964 Mahasati Anusuya
  1964 Sawal Maza Aika
  1965 Malhari Martand
  1965 Aai Kuna Mhanu Mee
  1965 Saadhi Mansa (1965)
  1965 Gopal - Krishna
  1965 Aai Kuna Mhanu Mee
  1966 Patlachi Soon
  1967 Suranga Mhantyat Mala
  1967 Lav-Kush
  1967 Baharon Ke Sapne
  1968 Ek Gaav Bara Bhangadi
  1968 Har Har Gange
  1968 Balram Shri Krishna
  1970 Dagabaaz
  1970 Bhagwan Parshuram
  1971 अशीच एक रात्र होती 
  1971 Lakhat Ashi Dekhani
  1971 Tulsi Vivah
  1971 Shri Krishna Leela
  1971 Shree Krishnarjun Yuddh
  1971 Kasa Kai Patil Bara Hai Ka
  1972 Naag Panchami
  1972 Hari Darshan
  1973 Mahasati Savitri
  1973 Aai Ude Ga Ambabai
  1974 Kisan Aur Bhagwan
  1974 Har Har Mahadev
  1974 Dawat
  1974 Bhagat Dhanna Jatt
  1974 Balak Dhruv
  1975 Ek Gaon Ki Kahani
  1976 Bajrangbali
  1977 Mahima Shree Ram Ki
  1977 Gayatri Mahima
  1978 Adventures of Aladdin
  1979 Har Har Gange
  1980 Kadaklakshmi
  1981 Sansani: The Sensation
  1981 Soon Mazi Laxmi 
  1981 Jiyo To Aise Jiyo
  1982 Aavhan
  1983 Sati Naag Kanya
  1983 Sampoorna Mahabharat
  1984 Sulagte Armaan
  1984 Sindoor Ka Daan
  1984 Shravan Kumar
  1984/II Maya Bazaar
  1984 Naya Kadam
  1985   Masterji
  1986 Veer Bhimsen
  1986 Patton Ki Bazi
  1986 Krishna-Krishna
  1986 Bijli
  1986 Ramayan (TV series)
  1987 Sher Shivaji
  1987 Purnasatya 
  1987 Khooni Darinda
  1987 Nazrana
  1987 Bhatak Bhavani
  1988 Mar Mitenge
  1989 Eeshwar
  1989 Kanoon Apna Apna
  1990  Amiri Garibi
  1991 Bombay to Mauritius 
  1992 Maalmasala
  1997 Lav Kush
  2000 Saubhagyadan

In later years, Jayshree turned film director. Her directorial efforts include Saasar Maher and Ashi Asavi Saasu. She also acted in Ramanand Sagar's TV Series Ramayana, as Kaushalya (mother of Rama) along with her husband Bal Dhuri, who was Dasharath (father of Rama). Her home is adorned with the photo of both in Ramayana costume. Her Autobiography Ashi Me Jayshree was published in 1986.

Awards
Gadkar has received awards for her part in the films Manini, Vaijantha, Sawaal Majha Aika! and Saadhi Mansa.

See also
 Bal Dhuri

References

External links
 
Jayshree Gadkar in Marathi Movie
Remembering Jayshree Gadkar
Some more pictures from Marathi movies

1942 births
2008 deaths
Actresses from Karnataka
Actresses in Marathi cinema
Indian film actresses
Marathi people
People from Uttara Kannada
People from Karwar
Actresses in Hindi cinema
Konkani people
20th-century Indian actresses